Roseline may refer to:

Roseline Chepngetich (born 1997), Kenyan steeplechase runner
Roseline Delisle (1952–2003), Canadian ceramic artist
Roseline Éloissaint (born 1999), Haitian footballer
Roseline Filion (born 1987), retired Canadian diver
Roseline Fonkwa (born 1975), Cameroonian movie producer and businesswoman
Roseline Granet (born 1936), French sculptor and painter
Roseline Konya, academic and a politician from Khana, Rivers State
Annie Marie Roseline Gatienne Moniqui (born 1990), Canadian weightlifter
Roseline Omotosho (died 1999), Nigerian judge
Roseline Osipitan, Nigerian business executive and Yoruba princess
Roseline Emma Rasolovoahangy, candidate in the Madagascar presidential elections of 2013 and 2018
Roseline Ukeje (born 1943), Nigerian jurist, the first female Chief Judge of the High Court of Nigeria
Roseline Vachetta (born 1951), French Trotskyist politician
Roseline de Villeneuve (1263–1329), French Roman Catholic saint

See also
Rosaleen
Rosalina (disambiguation)
Rosaline
Rosalyn (disambiguation)
Rosellini
Rosolin
Rosolina
Rosolini
Rossellini
Rossellino
Rosslyn (disambiguation)
Rozalin (disambiguation)
Rozalén
Rusalina